American Legion Field is a baseball venue in Florence, South Carolina, United States. The venue was built in 1968 and has a capacity of 3,500. The field's dimensions are 305 ft. down the foul lines, 335 ft. to the gaps, and 385 ft. to dead center field.

Former tenants
Between 1981 and 1986, the park was home to the Florence Blue Jays of the South Atlantic League. The park hosted the Florence Flame of the now defunct Atlantic Coast League for one season in 1995.

It was the home of the Florence RedWolves of the Coastal Plain League, a collegiate summer baseball league. The RedWolves played at the field from 1998 to 2012, before moving to nearby Francis Marion University's Sparrow Stadium during the 2012 season.

This was also home to the Florence–Darlington Tech (JUCO) Stingers baseball team from 2004–2012 before they moved to Francis Marion University, splitting home games between old Cormell Field and Sparrow Stadium.

References

Defunct minor league baseball venues
Defunct college baseball venues in the United States
Sports venues in Florence County, South Carolina
Baseball venues in South Carolina
Buildings and structures in Florence, South Carolina